Archie Shepp & the New York Contemporary Five is a live album by the New York Contemporary Five recorded at the Jazzhus Montmartre in Copenhagen, Denmark, on November 15, 1963, and featuring saxophonists Archie Shepp and John Tchicai, trumpeter Don Cherry, bassist Don Moore and drummer J. C. Moses. The album was originally released on the Sonet label in 1964 as New York Contemporary 5 in two separate volumes on LP and later as an edited concert on a single CD, removing the track "Cisum."

Reception

The Allmusic review by Scott Yanow calls the album "historically significant". John Barron wrote that the album declared "the arrival of a bold musical endeavor, intent on championing new sounds, heavily influenced by Ornette Coleman, Thelonius Monk, John Coltrane and Cecil Taylor," and "Having stood the test of time, this historically important — but shamefully underappreciated — live recording of The New York Contemporary Five sounds fresh and far-reaching almost fifty years later." Jerry D'Souza wrote: "Given that the players went on to marked careers in the fiefdom of free jazz, this is certainly an historic document that stands as a take-off point." Zachary Young wrote: "There's little that hasn't been written already about these musicians. Suffice it to say that the present set finds them in excellent form. An egalitarian ethos permeates the performance; the musicians are equal partners, and no one horn predominates."

Track listing 
 "Consequences" (Don Cherry) -  8:38
 "Monk's Mood" (Thelonious Monk) - 2:30
 "Emotions" (Ornette Coleman) - 8:44
 "Wo Wo" (John Tchicai) - 5:51
 "Trio" (Bill Dixon) - 15:28
 "Crepuscule With Nellie" (Monk) - 2:15
 "O.C." (Coleman) - 6:41
 "When Will the Blues Leave?" (Coleman) - 8:58
 "The Funeral" (Archie Shepp) - 5:05
 "Mick" (Tchicai) - 7:39
Recorded in Copenhagen, Denmark on November 15, 1963.

Personnel 
 Archie Shepp: tenor saxophone
 John Tchicai: alto saxophone
 Don Cherry: trumpet
 Don Moore: bass
 J. C. Moses: drums

References 

New York Contemporary Five albums
John Tchicai live albums
Sonet Records live albums
1963 live albums
Archie Shepp live albums